Ferdinand Wittmann (September 11, 1836 – 1868) was a German sixfold poisoner who used arsenic. He was the youngest serial killer in German criminal history.

Life 
After his training as a bookbinder, he opened a bookbindery in Wollin in 1859. He married four times between 1860 and 1865, and from these marriages he fathered two children and became the stepfather of another girl.

Victims 
 Emilie Maria Wittmann (née Gehm)

Wittmann married Emilie Maria Gehm in Wollin on November 16, 1860, with whom he fathered two children; Johannes (according to another source Hugo) and Louis.

In the period from September 3 to 16, the local hospital treated Mrs. Wittmann, who died nonetheless. In the death certificate, it was stated that her death was the result of endometritis.

Wittmann received the life insurance from a company called Germania.

 Johannes Wittmann's son

The son of Johannes fell ill on January 31, 1863 and died despite the medical care by the local Sanitätsrat Schmurr on February 2, 1863.

 Auguste Charlotte Wittmann (née Höhn)

Wittmann then married on June 15, 1863 Auguste Charlotte Höhn, who died on December 22, 1863.

 Auguste Wittmann (née Kornotzky)

Soon afterwards, on April 1, 1864, Wittmann married Auguste Kornotzky (also spelled Kornitzki), who died on August 15, 1865.

 Mrs. Böse

Wittmann married on October 17, 1865 in Wollin the widow of the drowned in September 1864 ship captain Böse, thus becoming a stepfather to the orphaned Georgine Auguste Alwine Böse. On July 13, 1866, she gave birth to another child. He moved with his wife, their daughter and this 3-year-old son Louis to Poznan. His wife fell ill on September 17, 1866 and died untreated on the following day. Oberstabsarzt Mayer and chief physician Laube could only determine the cause of death.

 Georgine Auguste Alwine Böse

The child fell ill on October 22, 1865, and received medical treatment from Vienna on the following day, once in the morning and in the evening. In the night of October 23 to 24, and the doctor, Dr. Wiener, said that the cause of death was meningitis.

Heinrich Schönborn (1804–1893) was the second pastor of the Kreuzkirche community and gave Wittmann permission for the translocation of his stepdaughter.

Preliminary investigation 
On the request of Edmund Bärensprung (1816-1868), Chief Police in Poznan, wanted an autopsy to be performed on Mrs. Wittmann's body.

To determine the cause of death on October 17, 1866, the bodies of all the dead relatives of Wittmann were exhumed in Wollin's Protestant Cemetery.

Criminal proceedings 
The jury trial was scheduled for February 17, 1868 and opened on June 22, 1868. His defender was the later Justice Council August Dockhorn. The charge was represented by Justice H. Schmnieden, represented in the appellate court in Poznan.

The procedure was also reported by the foreign press.

See also
 List of German serial killers

Literature 
 Julius Eduard Hitzig, Willibald Alexis: The new Pitaval. Leipzig, 1869.

References 

1836 births
1868 deaths
19th-century executions
19th-century murders in Germany
Criminals from Rhineland-Palatinate
Executed German serial killers
Male serial killers
Mariticides
Murderers for life insurance money
People executed by Prussia
People from Wolin (town)
Poisoners